The Chemins de fer de l'Est was one of the five main constituents of the SNCF at its creation in 1938.

Preserved locomotives

References

 
Est
Est
Est locomotives